Pseudocyttus maculatus, the smooth oreo or smooth dory, is an oreo, the only species in the genus Pseudocyttus.

References
 "Pseudocyttus maculatus" IUCN Red List of Threatened Species 2010
 
 Tony Ayling & Geoffrey Cox, Collins Guide to the Sea Fishes of New Zealand,  (William Collins Publishers Ltd., Auckland, New Zealand 1982) 

Oreosomatidae
Monotypic ray-finned fish genera
Fish described in 1906